Petropavlovka is a rural locality (a village) in Kacheganovsky Selsoviet, Miyakinsky District, Bashkortostan, Russia. The population was 46 as of 2010. There are 4 streets.

Geography 
Petropavlovka is located 29 km south of Kirgiz-Miyaki (the district's administrative centre) by road. Akyar is the nearest rural locality.

References 

Rural localities in Miyakinsky District